Fabiana Correra  (born 1 October 1967) is an Italian footballer who played as a midfielder for the Italy women's national football team. She was part of the team at the inaugural 1991 FIFA Women's World Cup. On club level she played for Turris in Italy.

References

External links
 

1967 births
Living people
Italian women's footballers
Italy women's international footballers
Place of birth missing (living people)
1991 FIFA Women's World Cup players
Women's association football midfielders